Charles F. Freeman (June 20, 1832 – April 24, 1915) was an American businessman and politician.

Freeman was born in Corydon, McKean County, Pennsylvania. He went to the McKean County public schools. In 1857, Freeman moved to Milwaukee, Wisconsin and was a commission merchant. He was involved with the Milwaukee Chamber of Commerce. Freeman served on the Milwaukee school board and was a Democrat. He served in the Wisconsin Assembly in 1871 and 1880. Freeman died in Milwaukee, Wisconsin from a long illness.

Notes

1832 births
1915 deaths
People from McKean County, Pennsylvania
Businesspeople from Milwaukee
Politicians from Milwaukee
School board members in Wisconsin
Democratic Party members of the Wisconsin State Assembly
19th-century American businesspeople